Pultenaea costata, commonly known as ribbed bush-pea, is a species of flowering plant in the family Fabaceae and is endemic to the Grampians National Park in Victoria. It is a spreading shrub with egg-shaped to lance-shaped leaves, and dense clusters of pea-like flowers.

Description
The fruit is a pod surrounded by the remains of the sepals.

Taxonomy and naming
Pultenaea costata was first formally described in 1921 by Herbert Bennett Williamson in the Proceedings of the Royal Society of Victoria from specimens collected near Mount William. The specific epithet (costata) means "ribbed".

Distribution and habitat
This pultenaea grows on the higher parts of the northern ranges of the Grampians in central western Victoria.

References

costata
Flora of Victoria (Australia)
Plants described in 1921